Anwar El Ghazi (Arabic: أنور الغازي; Riffian-Berber: ⴰⵏⵡⴰⵔ ⵍⴴⴰⵣⵉ; born 3 May 1995) is a Dutch professional footballer who plays as a winger for PSV and the Netherlands national team.

He played for Ajax, Lille and Aston Villa before joining PSV in 2022.

Club career

Early career
El Ghazi began his football career in the youth ranks of his local club BVV Barendrecht, joining the youth academy of Feyenoord for two seasons. He then joined the ranks of Spartaan '20 before being recruited to Sparta Rotterdam, where he progressed through the academy. In 2013, he joined the Ajax Youth Academy, playing for the A1 selection (under-19), competing in the UEFA Youth League.

Ajax

El Ghazi was signed by Ajax in July 2013. During the 2014–15 pre-season, he scored 8 goals in 150 minutes of playing time, finishing as Ajax's top pre-season scorer. While Ajax initially intended to send El Ghazi to their reserve team, Jong Ajax, El Ghazi's pre-season prompted Ajax to include him in the first-team squad, following the loan of fellow winger Lesley de Sa to Go Ahead Eagles. El Ghazi made his official debut for Ajax in the 2014 Johan Cruyff Shield against PEC Zwolle, coming on for Ricardo Kishna in the 1–0 loss at home.

El Ghazi made his regular season debut for Ajax in the 2014–15 Eredivisie season opener against Vitesse. The match ended in a 4–1 home victory, with El Ghazi providing the assist for the fourth goal by Lasse Schöne in the 87th minute. On 17 August 2014, El Ghazi scored his first Eredivisie goal in the 3–1 away win against AZ, scoring in the 90th minute. He scored his first UEFA Champions League goal on 22 October 2014 at Camp Nou against Barcelona in the 88th minute of a 3–1 loss. In so doing, he became the first player to score at Camp Nou since the beginning of the 2014–15 season, when Barcelona went five matches at home without conceding a goal.

Lille
On 31 January 2017, it was announced El Ghazi had been sold to French Ligue 1 side Lille for a €8 million transfer fee. On 18 February, he scored his first goal for Lille against Caen, which also became the winner (0–1).

On 6 August 2017, on the first matchday of the 2017–18 season, El Ghazi scored Lille's third goal against Nantes. To celebrate, he took off his shirt to reveal a shirt paying tribute to Abdelhak Nouri, his former Ajax teammate who the month before had collapsed and suffered a cardiac arrhythmia attack, which had left him with severe and permanent brain damage and unable to continue as a footballer. During the 2017–18 season, El Ghazi scored four goals and delivered two assists in 27 appearances. The Dutch striker distinguished himself in particular during the match against RC Strasbourg, on 28 January 2018 at home at the Stade Pierre-Mauroy, where he scored the first goal; a header, after an assist by Nicolas Pépé. He then delivered an assist for the Edgar Ié, sealing the win for Lille.

On 18 February 2018, El Ghazi suffered a hamstring injury against Lyon, sidelining him for several weeks. Due to complications, he did not return until the end of the season, where he struggled to establish himself in head coach Christophe Galtier's starting lineup.

Aston Villa 
On 22 August 2018, El Ghazi signed for Championship club Aston Villa on a season-long loan, with a clause to buy included. He made his debut on 25 August 2018 in a 1–1 draw with Reading, providing an assist by crossing the ball to Ahmed Elmohamady, who scored a header. He scored his first goal for the Villains a week later on 1 September 2018 in a 4-1 defeat to Sheffield United.

On 28 April 2019, in a heated contest between Aston Villa and Championship playoff rivals Leeds United at Elland Road, El Ghazi was mistakenly shown a red card by referee Stuart Attwell. This occurred after El Ghazi allegedly struck Leeds forward Patrick Bamford during an on pitch brawl following Mateusz Klich's controversial 72nd opening goal for Leeds United following Tyler Roberts' refusal to put the ball out of touch for an injury. The decision was met with controversy from fans and pundits alike, with Aston Villa head coach Dean Smith claiming that after reviewing the footage of the incident reported that he'd be 'amazed' if the red card and subsequent three-game ban weren't overturned after appeal. The red card and ban were later rescinded and on 2 May, Bamford was banned for two games for "successful deception of a match official".

On 27 May 2019, El Ghazi scored Aston Villa's first goal in their 2–1 EFL Championship Play-off final victory over Derby County.  In the 44th minute he met an Ahmed Elmohamady cross from the right with an attempted diving header which diverted in off his back.  In the second half an El Ghazi shot from just outside the penalty area was blocked by Richard Keogh, looping up for John McGinn to steal in and score with a header, putting Aston Villa 2–0 up in the tie on 59 minutes.

El Ghazi signed for Villa permanently on 10 June 2019 on a four-year contract for an undisclosed fee. He scored 4 goals and contributed 4 assists in his first Premier League season, as Villa narrowly avoided relegation.

On 26 December 2020, El Ghazi scored a goal in the 3–0 home victory over Crystal Palace that would go onto to be voted Aston Villa's goal of the season for the 2020–21 season. It was one of 11 goals scored that season, equalling his best ever goalscoring season with Ajax.

Everton 

El Ghazi signed for Everton on loan on 13 January 2022. He took the number 34 shirt in honour of former Ajax teammate Abdelhak Nouri.

PSV 

On 30 August 2022, El Ghazi completed a move to PSV Eindhoven. He made his debut in a 2–1 defeat to Twente on 3 September.

International career
Having dual citizenship, El Ghazi was eligible to represent either the Netherlands or Morocco at senior level. He made his international debut playing for the Netherlands under-18 side in a friendly match against Austria on 15 October 2012, a 2–0 loss.

Netherlands
El Ghazi met Cristiano Ronaldo during the summer break, a player who he looks up to, and asked him whether he should represent the Netherlands or Morocco. Ronaldo advised him to choose the Netherlands because he would have a higher chance to participate in an international tournament, based on their history. Consequently, El Ghazi said he would choose to represent the Netherlands and was subsequently called up for the Netherlands' two final UEFA Euro 2016 qualifying matches, against Kazakhstan on 10 October 2015 and the Czech Republic on 13 October. He was named in the Oranjes starting line-up for both matches as the Dutch defeated Kazakhstan 2–1 but lost to the Czechs 3–2. The Netherlands failed to qualify for the tournament proper after finishing fourth in their qualifying group.

On 14 May 2021, El Ghazi was called up by Frank de Boer and the Netherlands to be part of the provisional squad for the upcoming UEFA Euro 2020 tournament, making it his first call-up to the national team since 2015.

Morocco
In October 2022 El Ghazi confirmed that he was considering switching to Morocco and that the Royal Moroccan Football Federation was working on the paperwork.

Career statistics
Club

International

HonoursAston VillaEFL Championship play-offs: 2019
EFL Cup runner-up: 2019–20Individual'
Ajax Talent of the Year (Marco van Basten Award): 2015

References

External links

Profile at the PSV Eindhoven website
Netherlands U17 stats at OnsOranje 
Netherlands U18 stats at OnsOranje 

1995 births
Living people
Footballers from Barendrecht
Dutch footballers
Netherlands youth international footballers
Netherlands under-21 international footballers
Netherlands international footballers
Association football wingers
BVV Barendrecht players
AFC Ajax players
Lille OSC players
Aston Villa F.C. players
Everton F.C. players
PSV Eindhoven players
Eredivisie players
Ligue 1 players
English Football League players
Premier League players
Dutch expatriate footballers
Expatriate footballers in England
Expatriate footballers in France
Dutch expatriate sportspeople in England
Dutch expatriate sportspeople in France
Dutch sportspeople of Moroccan descent